Euryptera is a genus of beetles in the family Cerambycidae, containing the following species:

 Euryptera albosterna Chemsak & Linsley, 1974
 Euryptera latipennis Lepeletier & Aud.-Serville in Latreille, 1828
 Euryptera leonina Gounelle, 1911
 Euryptera nigrosuturalis Melzer, 1935
 Euryptera unilineatocollis Fuchs, 1956

References

Lepturinae